Andrzej Zygmunt (13 November 1945 – 4 April 2022) was a Polish footballer. He played in one match for the Poland national football team in 1971.

References

External links
 

1945 births
2022 deaths
Polish footballers
Poland international footballers
Association footballers not categorized by position
People from Sochaczew